The 2002–03 West Midlands (Regional) League season was the 103rd in the history of the West Midlands (Regional) League, an English association football competition for semi-professional and amateur teams based in the West Midlands county, Shropshire, Herefordshire, Worcestershire and southern Staffordshire.

Premier Division

The Premier Division featured 21 clubs which competed in the division last season, along with one new club:
Sedgeley White Lions, promoted from Division One South

Also, Smethwick Rangers changed name to Smethwick Sikh Temple.

League table

References

External links

2002–03
9